T.B. was a three-wheeled cyclecar manufactured by the aircraft department of Thompson Brothers of Bilston, England, from 1919 until 1924. A prototype four-wheel car never entered production. Approximately 150 cars were produced of which only one example is believed to have survived.

History
Thompson Brothers was founded in 1810 in Bilston in the Black Country region of South Staffordshire (now the West Midlands), and in 1882 it was purchased by Enoch Stephen Thompson. The company was based at the Bradley Engineering Works, on Great Bridge Road, Bilston. Initially they manufactured steam boilers, but during World War I they diversified into aircraft components.  After the war the tax regulations lead to a boom in cyclecar production so the aircraft department produced a three-wheeled, open, two seater, cycle car that followed aircraft engineering practises and workmanship standards, using high grade materials.

The main appeal of cycle-cars was cheapness to buy and run, but in the overpopulated car market of the 1920s the cost of four-wheeled cars fell to that of cycle-cars, the business tailed off, component acquisition was troublesome, and T.B. only sold 150 cars. Although they designed a four-wheeled car it was never produced.

After the demise of the cyclecar business Thompson became a leading manufacturer of commercial vehicles such as fuel tankers and airport fire tenders.

In 1935, an unusual three-wheeled aircraft refueller was successfully introduced for servicing light aeroplanes at civil aerodromes and during World War II many later variants were manufactured for military use. Many continued in use at civil aerodromes and airports in Britain until the 1960s and 1970s with a few still in use (e.g. at North Weald and Leicester East) in the 1990s. At least 20 examples are known to survive worldwide with museums and private owners today.

Eventually the company became part of the Northern Engineering Industries Group.

Models

The first model produced was the 1920 cyclecar equipped with a 10 hp. air-cooled engine mated to a leather clutch and two-speed gearbox. Design and development had taken approximately 12 months and a prototype completed a 2,000 mile test. The shapely "radiator" was a combined three-gallon petrol tank and three-quart oil tank.

By 1921 they used a 10 hp JAP water-cooled engine and a floating plate clutch to drive the three-speed gearbox.

By 1924 the sports model was equipped with a 10 hp water-cooled Anzani engine and an aluminium body.

List of models
Primary table source : University of Wolverhampton. History and Heritage, Thompson Brothers 

 1920 Cycle car. 10 hp, air-cooled, steel body. £200.
 1921 Standard. 8-10 hp, J.A.P. air-cooled, steel body. £235.
 1921 Deluxe. 8-10 hp, J.A.P. water-cooled, steel body. £250.
 1922 Standard. 8-10 hp, J.A.P. air-cooled, steel body. £155.
 1922 Deluxe. 8-10 hp, J.A.P. water-cooled, steel body. £165.
 1922 Sports. 8-10 hp, J.A.P. water-cooled, steel body.
 1923 Standard. 8-10 hp, J.A.P. air-cooled, steel body. £155.
 1923 Deluxe. 8-10 hp, J.A.P. water-cooled, steel body. £165.
 1923 Sports. 8-10 hp, J.A.P. water-cooled, steel body.
 1924 Standard. 8-10 hp, J.A.P. air-cooled), steel body. £152
 1924 Deluxe. 8-10 hp, J.A.P. water-cooled, steel body. £160
 1924 Family. 8-10 hp, J.A.P. water-cooled, steel body. £162
 1924 Sports. 8-10 hp, Anzani. water-cooled, aluminium body. £170

Competition

From 1920 to 1922 T.B.s competed regularly in national events, scoring 27 victories, 31 gold medals, 12 silver and 5 bronze.

They competed in:
1920 - London-Edinburgh; London-Holyhead; London-Bala-London; London-Exeter-London 
1921 - Colmore Cup; Victory Cup; London-Land's End; A.C.U. Centre; London-Manchester; Travers Trial; London-Holyhead; London-Edinburgh; Moffat Cup; Reliability Trial; Sheffield-Holyhead; Reliability Trial; Reliability Trial; Sheffield-Hunstanton; A.C.U. 6 days; Nailsworth Ladder; London-Exeter; London-Gloucester
1922 - Colmore Cup; General Efficiency; Stock Trial; Victory Cup; One Day Reliability; London-Land's End; London-Holyhead; Reliability Trial; Reliability Trial; Open Reliability Trial; Vesey Cup Trial; London-Edinburgh; Sheffield 24 hours; A.C.U. Midland; M.C. & A.C. 24 hrs; A.C.U. 6 days; Cannock and Walsall Reliability; A.C. & N.B.A.C. Hill Climb; A.C. & N.B.A.C. Shell Cup; Midland Car Club

Surviving models
There is reportedly only one model still surviving, at the Black Country Living Museum at Dudley.

See also
 List of car manufacturers of the United Kingdom

References

External links
Black-country memories - Thompson Brothers
Black Country Living Museum at Dudley - possible home to last surviving model
High quality pictures of TB on 1923 Victory Cup Trial

Cyclecars
Three-wheeled motor vehicles
Defunct motor vehicle manufacturers of England
Manufacturing companies based in Wolverhampton